Mammals in Western Australia include both native and introduced species.

Subclass: Prototheria

Order: Monotremata 
 Family: Tachyglossidae
 Genus: Tachyglossus
 Short-beaked echidna, T. aculeatus

Subclass: Eutheria

Infraclass: Marsupialia

Order: Dasyuromorphia 
 Family: Dasyuridae
 Subfamily: Dasyurinae
 Tribe: Dasyurini
 Genus: Dasycercus
 Brush-tailed mulgara, D. blythi 
 Crest-tailed mulgara, D. cristicauda 
 Genus: Dasykaluta
 Little red kaluta, D. rosamondae 
 Genus: Dasyurus
 Western quoll, D. geoffroii 
 Northern quoll, D. hallucatus 
 Genus: Parantechinus
 Dibbler, P. apicalis 
 Genus: Pseudantechinus
 Fat-tailed false antechinus, P. macdonnellensis 
 Ningbing false antechinus, P. ningbing 
 Rory Cooper's false antechinus, P. roryi 
 Woolley's false antechinus, P. woolleyae 
 Tribe: Phascogalini
 Genus: Antechinus
 Yellow-footed antechinus, A. flavipes 
 Genus: Phascogale
 Red-tailed phascogale, P. calura 
 Brush-tailed phascogale, P. tapoatafa 
 Subfamily: Sminthopsinae
 Tribe: Planigalini
 Genus: Planigale
 Long-tailed planigale, P. ingrami 
 Common planigale, P. maculata 
 Tribe: Sminthopsini
 Genus: Antechinomys
 Kultarr, A. laniger 
 Genus: Ningaui
 Wongai ningaui, N. ridei 
 Pilbara ningaui, N. timealeyi 
 Southern ningaui, N. yvonneae 
 Genus: Sminthopsis
 Carpentarian dunnart, S. butleri 
 Fat-tailed dunnart, S. crassicaudata 
 Little long-tailed dunnart, S. dolichura 
 Gilbert's dunnart, S. gilberti 
 White-tailed dunnart, S. granulipes 
 Grey-bellied dunnart, S. griseoventer 
 Hairy-footed dunnart, S. hirtipes 
 Long-tailed dunnart, S. longicaudata 
 Stripe-faced dunnart, S. macroura 
 Ooldea dunnart, S. ooldea 
 Sandhill dunnart, S. psammophila 
 Red-cheeked dunnart, S. virginiae 
 Lesser hairy-footed dunnart, S. youngsoni 
 Family: Myrmecobiidae
 Genus: Myrmecobius
 Numbat, M. fasciatus

Order: Peramelemorphia 
 Family: Chaeropodidae
 Genus: Chaeropus
 Pig-footed bandicoot, Chaeropus ecaudatus EX
 Family: Peramelidae
 Genus: Isoodon
 Golden bandicoot, Isoodon auratus VU
 Northern brown bandicoot, Isoodon macrourus LC
 Southern brown bandicoot, Isoodon obesulus LC
 Genus: Perameles
 Western barred bandicoot, Perameles bougainville EN
 Desert bandicoot, Perameles eremiana EX
 Family: Thylacomyidae Genus: Macrotis Greater bilby, Macrotis lagotis VU
 Lesser bilby, Macrotis leucura EX

 Order: Notoryctemorphia 
 Family: Notoryctidae
 Genus: Notoryctes Northern marsupial mole, Notoryctes caurinus DD
 Southern marsupial mole, Notoryctes typhlops DD

 Order: Diprotodontia
 Suborder: Macropodiformes 
 Family: Potoroidae
 Genus: Bettongia Burrowing bettong, Bettongia lesueur Woylie, Bettongia penicillata)
 Gilbert's potoroo, Potorous gilbertii endemic
 Broad-faced potoroo, Potorous platyops EX

Macropodidae
 Central hare-wallaby, Lagorchestes asomatus Spectacled hare-wallaby, Lagorchestes conspicillatus Mala, Lagorchestes hirsutus Banded hare-wallaby, Lagostrophus fasciatus endemic
 Western grey kangaroo, Macropus fuliginosus Agile wallaby, Notamacropus agilis Tammar wallaby, Notamacropus eugenii Western brush wallaby, Notamacropus irma endemic
 Crescent nail-tail wallaby, Onychogalea lunata EX
 Northern nail-tail wallaby, Onychogalea unguifera Antilopine wallaroo, Osphranter antilopinus Common wallaroo, Osphranter robustus Red kangaroo, Osphranter rufus Short-eared rock-wallaby, Petrogale brachyotis Monjon, Petrogale burbidgei Nabarlek, Petrogale concinna Black-flanked rock-wallaby, Petrogale lateralis Rothschild's rock-wallaby, Petrogale rothschildi endemic
 Quokka, Setonix brachyurus - endemic

Phalangeriformes (possums and gliders)
Phalangeridae
 Common brushtail possum, Trichosurus vulpecula Scaly-tailed possum, Wyulda squamicaudata endemic

Petauridae
 Savanna glider, Petaurus arielPseudocheiridae
 Rock ringtail possum, Petropseudes dahli Western ringtail possum, Pseudocheirus occidentalis endemic

Burramyidae
 Western pygmy possum, Cercartetus concinnusTarsipedidae
 Honey possum, Tarsipes rostratus endemic
 Suborder: Vombatiformes
 Family: Vombatidae
 Genus: Lasiorhinus Southern hairy-nosed wombat, Lasiorhinus latifrons LC

Chiroptera (bats)
 Pteropodidae (fruitbats) 
 Northern blossom-bat, Macroglossus minimus Black flying fox, Pteropus alecto Little red flying-fox, Pteropus scapulatus Megadermatidae 
 Ghost bat, Macroderma gigas Hipposideridae 
 Dusky leaf-nosed bat, Hipposideros ater Northern leaf-nosed bat, Hipposideros stenotis Orange leaf-nosed bat, Rhinonicteris aurantius Emballonuridae 
 Yellow-bellied sheath-tailed bat, Saccolaimus flaviventris Common sheath-tailed bat, Taphozous georgianus Hill's sheath-tailed bat, Taphozous hilli Vespertilionidae 
 Gould's wattled bat, Chalinolobus gouldii 
 Chocolate wattled bat, Chalinolobus morio 
 Hoary wattled bat, Chalinolobus nigrogriseus 
 Western false pipistrelle, Falsistrellus mackenziei endemic
 Common bent-wing bat, Miniopterus schreibersii 
 Large-footed bat, Myotis moluccarum 
 Arnhem long-eared bat, Nyctophilus arnhemensis 
 Northwestern long-eared bat, Nyctophilus bifax 
 Lesser long-eared bat, Nyctophilus geoffroyi 
 Gould's long-eared bat, Nyctophilus gouldi 
 Greater long-eared bat, Nyctophilus timoriensis 
 Pygmy long-eared bat, Nyctophilus walkeri 
 Northern pipistrelle, Pipistrellus westralis 
 Inland broad-nosed bat, Scotorepens balstoni 
 Little broad-nosed bat, Scotorepens greyii 
 Northern broad-nosed bat, Scotorepens sanborni 
 Inland forest bat, Vespadelus baverstocki 
 Northern cave bat, Vespadelus caurinus 
 Yellow-lipped cave bat, Vespadelus douglasorum endemic
 Finlayson's cave bat, Vespadelus finlaysoni 
 Southern forest bat, Vespadelus regulus Molossidae 
 Northern freetail bat, Chaerephon jobensis 
 Beccari's free-tailed bat, Mormopterus beccarii 
 Little northern freetail bat, Mormopterus loriae 
 Southern free-tailed bat, Mormopterus planiceps 
 White-striped free-tailed bat, Tadarida australisRodentia (rodents)
 Muridae (rats and mice) 
 Rio Negro brush-tailed rat, Conilurus penicillatus 
 Rakali, Hydromys chrysogaster 
 Forrest's mouse, Leggadina forresti 
 Short-tailed hopping mouse, Leggadina lakedownensis 
 Lesser stick-nest rat, Leporillus apicalis EX
 Greater stick-nest rat, Leporillus conditor 
 Grassland melomys, Melomys burtoni 
 Black-footed tree-rat, Mesembriomys gouldii 
 Golden-backed tree-rat, Mesembriomys macrurus 
 House mouse, Mus musculus - naturalised exotic
 Spinifex hopping mouse, Notomys alexis 
 Long-tailed hopping mouse, Notomys longicaudatus EX
 Big-eared hopping mouse, Notomys macrotis EX
 Mitchell's hopping mouse, Notomys mitchelli 
 Ash-grey mouse, Pseudomys albocinereus 
 Plains rat, Pseudomys australis 
 Bolam's mouse, Pseudomys bolami 
 Western pebble-mound mouse, Pseudomys chapmani endemic
 Little native mouse, Pseudomys delicatulus 
 Desert mouse, Pseudomys desertor 
 Shark Bay mouse, Pseudomys fieldi 
 Sandy inland mouse, Pseudomys hermannsburgensis 
 Kimberley mouse, Pseudomys laborifex Western chestnut mouse, Pseudomys nanus 
 Western mouse, Pseudomys occidentalis - endemic
 Heath mouse, Pseudomys shortridgei 
 Pacific rat, Rattus exulans introduced
 Bush rat, Rattus fuscipes 
 Brown rat, Rattus norvegicus introduced
 Black rat, Rattus rattus introduced
 Pale field rat, Rattus tunneyi 
 Long-haired rat, Rattus villosissimus 
 Common rock rat, Zyzomys argurus 
 Central rock rat, Zyzomys pedunculatus 
 Kimberley rock rat, Zyzomys woodwardi endemic

 Sciuridae (squirrels) 
 Indian palm squirrel, Funambulus pennanti introduced

Lagomorpha (hares)
 Leporidae 
 European rabbit, Oryctolagus cuniculus introduced

Sirenia (sea cows)
 Dugongidae 
 Dugong, Dugong dugonCetacea cetaceans
Balaenidae
 Southern right whale, Eubalaena australisBalaenopteridae
 Dwarf minke whale, Balaenoptera acutorostrata 
 Antarctic minke whale, Balaenoptera bonaerensis 
 Sei whale, Balaenoptera borealis 
 Bryde's whale, Balaenoptera edeni 
 Blue whale, Balaenoptera musculus 
 Fin whale, Balaenoptera physalus 
 Humpback whale, Megaptera novaeangliaeNeobalaenidae
 Pygmy right whale, Caperea marginataPhyseteridae
 Sperm whale, Physeter macrocephalusKogiidae
 Pygmy sperm whale, Kogia breviceps 
 Dwarf sperm whale, Kogia simaZiphiidae
 Arnoux's beaked whale, Berdius arnuxii 
 Southern bottlenose whale, Hyperoodon planifrons 
 Andrews' beaked whale, Mesoplodon bowdoini 
 Blainville's beaked whale, Mesoplodon densirostris 
 Gray's beaked whale, Mesoplodon grayi 
 Hector's beaked whale, Mesoplodon hectori 
 Strap-toothed whale, Mesoplodon layardi 
 True's beaked whale, Mesoplodon mirus 
 Shepherd's beaked whale, Tasmancetus shepherdi 
 Cuvier's beaked whale, Ziphius cavirostrisDelphinidae
 Short-beaked common dolphin, Delphinus delphis 
 Pygmy killer whale, Feresa attenuata 
 Short-finned pilot whale, Globicephala macrorhynchus 
 Long-finned pilot whale, Globicephala melas 
 Risso's dolphin, Grampus griseus 
 Fraser's dolphin, Lagenodelphis hosei 
 Southern right whale dolphin, Lissadelphis peronii 
 Australian snubfin dolphin, Orcaella heinsohni 
 Killer whale, Orcinus orca 
 Melon-headed whale, Peponocephala electra 
 False killer whale, Pseudorca crassidens 
 Indo-Pacific humpback dolphin, Sousa chinensis 
 Spotted dolphin, Stenella attenuata 
 Striped dolphin, Stenella coeruleoalba 
 Spinner dolphin, Stenella longirostris 
 Rough-toothed dolphin, Steno bredanensis 
 Indo-Pacific bottlenose dolphin, Tursiops aduncus 
 Bottlenose dolphin, Tursiops truncatusCarnivora (Carnivores)
Otariidae (fur seals)
 New Zealand fur seal, Arctophoca forsteri Subantarctic fur seal, Arctophoca tropicalis Australian sea lion, Neophoca cinereaPhocidae (seals)
 Leopard seal, Hydrurga leptonyx 
 Crabeater seal, Lobodon carcinophagus 
 Southern elephant seal, Mirounga leoninaCanidae (dogs)
 Dingo, Canis familiaris dingo 
 Red fox, Vulpes vulpes introduced

Artiodactyla
Cervidae
 Common fallow deer, Dama dama'' introduced

References

 Checklist of the Vertebrate Fauna of Western Australia (WA Museum)

Mammals of Western Australia
Western Australia